Osipenko (Russian), Osypenko (Ukrainian), or Asipenka (Belarusian) may refer to:

People
Alla Osipenko (b. 1932), Russian ballerina
Alexander Osipenko (1910–1991), Soviet Lieutenant-General
Polina Osipenko (1907–1939), Soviet pilot, Hero of the Soviet Union

Inna Osypenko (b. 1982), Ukrainian sprint canoer
Dzmitry Asipenka (b. 1982), Belarusian soccer player

Populated places in Ukraine
Osypenko, Solone Raion, a village, Dnipropetrovsk Oblast, Ukraine
Osypenko, Berdyansk Raion, a village, Zaporizhia Oblast, Ukraine
Osypenko, Sevastopol, a village under the jurisdiction of the city of Sevastopol, Ukraine
Osypenko, name of the town of Berdyansk, Ukraine, in 1939–1958

See also
Imeni Poliny Osipenko District, a district of Khabarovsk Krai, Russia
Imeni Poliny Osipenko (rural locality), a rural locality (a selo), the administrative center of that district
Poliny Osipenko Street, name of Sadovnicheskaya Street, Moscow, Russia, in 1939–1991